Stop Making Sense is a 1984 American concert film featuring a live performance by the American rock band Talking Heads. Directed by Jonathan Demme, it was shot over the course of three nights at Hollywood's Pantages Theater in December 1983, as the group was touring to promote their new album Speaking in Tongues. The concert serves as a comprehensive retrospective of the band's history to that time, featuring many of their popular songs from their first hit single "Psycho Killer", through to their most recent album. In addition, the group performs one song, "Genius of Love", by the Tom Tom Club, a side project for two members of the band. The film is the first made entirely using digital audio techniques. The band raised the budget of $1.2 million themselves.

The four core members of Talking Heads: lead singer and guitarist David Byrne, drummer Chris Frantz, guitarist and keyboardist Jerry Harrison, and bassist Tina Weymouth, are joined on stage by an extensive supporting band including backing singers Lynn Mabry and Ednah Holt, guitarist Alex Weir, keyboardist Bernie Worrell, and percussionist Steve Scales.

Stop Making Sense is considered by many critics to be one of the greatest concert films of all time. Leonard Maltin called it "one of the greatest rock movies ever made", Robert Christgau "the finest concert film", and Pauline Kael "close to perfection". 
It is considered a cult classic.

In 2021, the film was selected for preservation in the United States National Film Registry by the Library of Congress as being "culturally, historically, or aesthetically significant".

Synopsis
Lead singer David Byrne walks on to a bare stage with a portable cassette tape player and an acoustic guitar. He introduces "Psycho Killer" by saying he wants to play a tape, but in reality a Roland TR-808 drum machine starts playing from the mixing board. The gunshot-like beats cause Byrne to stagger "like Jean-Paul Belmondo in the final minutes of 'Breathless,' a hero succumbing, surprised, to violence that he'd thought he was prepared for."

With each successive song, Byrne is joined by more members of the band: first by Tina Weymouth for "Heaven" (with Lynn Mabry providing harmony vocals from backstage), second by Chris Frantz for "Thank You for Sending Me an Angel", and third by Jerry Harrison for "Found a Job". Performance equipment is wheeled out and added to the set to accommodate the additional musicians: back-up singers Lynn Mabry and Ednah Holt, keyboardist Bernie Worrell, percussionist Steve Scales, and guitarist Alex Weir. The first song to feature the entire lineup is "Burning Down the House", although the original 1985 RCA/Columbia Home Video release (which featured three additional songs in two performances edited into the film) has the entire band (minus Worrell) performing "Cities" before this song. Byrne leaves the stage at one point to allow the Weymouth–Frantz-led side-band Tom Tom Club to perform their song "Genius of Love". The band also performs two songs from Byrne's soundtrack album The Catherine Wheel, "What a Day That Was" and (as a bonus song on the home video release) "Big Business".

The film includes Byrne's "big suit", an absurdly large business suit that he wears for the song "Girlfriend Is Better". The suit was partly inspired by Noh theatre styles, and became an icon not only of the film – as it appears on the movie poster, for instance – but of Byrne himself. Byrne said: "I was in Japan in between tours and I was checking out traditional Japanese theater – Kabuki, Noh, Bunraku – and I was wondering what to wear on our upcoming tour. A fashion designer friend (Jurgen Lehl) said in his typically droll manner, 'Well David, everything is bigger on stage.' He was referring to gestures and all that, but I applied the idea to a businessman's suit." Pauline Kael stated in her review: "When he comes on wearing a boxlike 'big suit' – his body lost inside this form that sticks out around him like the costumes in Noh plays, or like Beuys' large suit of felt that hangs off a wall – it's a perfect psychological fit." On the DVD he gives his reasoning behind the suit: "I wanted my head to appear smaller and the easiest way to do that was to make my body bigger, because music is very physical and often the body understands it before the head."

Setlist

DVD & Blu-ray

VHS & Laserdisc

*Songs available as extra features on DVD/Blu-ray releases, but not part of the main feature.

Personnel
The following are in order of appearance.
 David Byrne – lead vocals, guitar
 Tina Weymouth – bass, keyboard bass, guitar, lead vocals for "Genius of Love"
 Chris Frantz – drums, vocals for "Genius of Love"
 Jerry Harrison – guitar, keyboards, backing vocals
 Steve Scales – percussion, backing vocals
 Lynn Mabry – backing vocals
 Ednah Holt – backing vocals
 Alex Weir – guitar, backing vocals
 Bernie Worrell – keyboards

Filming
The filming of Stop Making Sense spanned four live shows at the Pantages Theater in Los Angeles, December 13–16, 1983. It pioneered the use of 24-track digital sound recording which resulted in a particularly clear soundtrack. Demme has stated that one night of shooting was dedicated almost entirely to wide shots from a distance, to minimize the intrusion of cameras on stage. Demme had considered additional shooting on a soundstage made to recreate the Pantages Theater, but the band declined to do this, as they thought the lack of audience response would have hindered the energy of their performance.  Before the shooting of the movie, David Byrne implored the band to wear neutral-coloured clothing so the stage lights would not illuminate anything too distinctive.  However, drummer Chris Frantz can still be seen wearing a turquoise-coloured polo shirt.

Demme also considered including more shots of the audience reacting to the performance, as is traditional in concert films. However, he discovered that filming the audience required additional lighting, which inhibited the audience's energy. This in turn made the band feel insecure and thus led to "the worst Talking Heads performance in the history of the band's career." The only direct audience shots in the film occur at the very end, during "Crosseyed and Painless."

Release
The film premiered during the San Francisco International Film Festival on April 24, 1984 and entered commercial release in the United States on October 19, 1984.

When the film was first released on home video, the songs "Cities" and "Big Business"/"I Zimbra" were restored to the performance, thus forming what was dubbed the "special edition" of the film. For the 1999 re-release, these songs were no longer included in sequence with the rest of the footage. It and subsequent video and DVD releases have placed these songs after the film in an unrestored full-frame version.

The film has been released on Blu-ray, widescreen DVD, VHS in both fullscreen and widescreen versions, and at one point Laserdisc (in Japan).

In March 2023, A24 acquired worldwide rights to the film, making it the second film the studio acquired after Pi, re-released a few days prior to the announcement. The studio plans to give it a re-release in 4K in theatres globally sometime in 2023. Rhino Entertainment will also release a deluxe version of the film's soundtrack, which will include the complete concert for the first time, on vinyl and digitally on August 18 the same year.

Reception
On review aggregator Rotten Tomatoes, Stop Making Sense has an approval rating of 100%, based on 41 reviews with an average rating of 9/10. The website's critical consensus reads, "Jonathan Demme's Stop Making Sense captures the energetic, unpredictable live act of peak Talking Heads with colour and visual wit." It won the National Society of Film Critics Award for best non-fiction film in 1984.

The film is widely regarded as one of the finest concert films. Leonard Maltin gave it four out of four, describing it as "brilliantly conceived, shot, edited and performed" and "one of the greatest rock movies ever made." Roger Ebert gave the film a three-and-a-half star rating, writing that "the  impression throughout Stop Making Sense is of enormous energy, of life being lived at a joyous high...It's a live show with elements of Metropolis...But the film's peak moments come through Byrne's simple physical presence. He jogs in place with his sidemen; he runs around the stage; he seems so happy to be alive and making music...He serves as a reminder of how sour and weary and strung-out many rock bands have become." Danny Peary described Stop Making Sense as "Riveting...What takes place on stage will make even the most sceptical into Talking Heads converts...[The] performances are invariably exciting, Byrne's lyrics are intriguing. Byrne, his head moving rhythmically as if he had just had shock treatments, is spellbinding – what a talent!...Byrne is known for his belief that music should be performed in an interesting, visual manner, and this should make him proud." Robert Christgau noted the "sinuous, almost elegant clarity" of Demme's direction, while writing that the film had pushed the "limits to how great a rock concert movie can be ... as far as they were liable to go." Christgau described it as "the finest concert film" while Pauline Kael of The New Yorker described it as "close to perfection".

Legacy
The movie version of "Once in a Lifetime" appeared over the opening credits of the 1986 film Down and Out in Beverly Hills.

Stop Making Sense was parodied in an episode of the comedy series Documentary Now! In the second-season episode "Final Transmission," the show sees the New Wave band Test Pattern play its final concert. It includes references to the staging and music styles of Talking Heads, with the band's lead singer (played by Fred Armisen) parodying Byrne. Gizmodo screened the episode to Frantz and Weymouth in a video released online, where they both expressed amusement and shock at the level of detail gone into parodying the film.

The iconic image of Byrne's big suit has been parodied on multiple occasions, including a spoof by Rich Hall impersonating Byrne and his big suit on an episode of Saturday Night Live. 	 Byrne himself made light of his massive suit during an appearance on The Late Show with Stephen Colbert, where he appeared in a fake ad for "David Byrne's Giant Suit Emporium" promoting his new clothing store while insisting he did not sell giant suits like the one he wore in Stop Making Sense. Byrne makes an appearance in the children's musical comedy special John Mulaney & the Sack Lunch Bunch performing an original song alongside child performer Lexi Perkel.  At one point, Byrne and Perkel wear matching pink suits, Perkel's being several sizes too large for her, in reference to Stop Making Sense.

In 2021, Stop Making Sense was selected for preservation in the United States National Film Registry by the Library of Congress as "culturally, historically, or aesthetically significant".

Soundtrack

See also
The Last Waltz (1978) - Martin Scorsese concert film featuring The Band
New Wave music
Worldbeat

References

Further reading

External links

 
Stop Making Sense at Metacritic

Official trailer

1984 films
1984 documentary films
American documentary films
American rock music films
Concert films
Films directed by Jonathan Demme
Films shot in Los Angeles
Films produced by Gary Goetzman
Live video albums
Talking Heads video albums
United States National Film Registry films
1980s English-language films
1980s American films